Minuscule 412 (in the Gregory-Aland numbering), ε 419 (in Soden's numbering), is a Greek minuscule manuscript of the New Testament, on parchment. It is dated by a colophon to the year 1301. 
It has marginalia.

Description 

The codex contains a complete text of the four Gospels on 329 parchment leaves. The text is written in one column per page, in 22 lines per page.

There is also a division according to the Ammonian Sections (in Mark 241 Sections, the last in 16:9), with references to the Eusebian Canons (written below Ammonian Section numbers).

John 1:1-14 was supplied by a later hand.

Text 

The Greek text of the codex is a representative of the Byzantine text-type. Aland placed it in Category V.
According to the Claremont Profile Method it represents textual family Kx in Luke 1, Luke 10, and Luke 20. It belongs also to the cluster 1394.

According to Gregory its text is similar to the manuscripts 483 and 484.

History 

The manuscript was written by Theodoros Hagiopetrites (as codex 74), a scribe. Wiedmann and J. G. J. Braun collated some portions of the manuscript for Scholz (1794-1852). The manuscript was added to the list of New Testament manuscripts by Scholz.
C. R. Gregory saw it in 1886.

The manuscript is currently housed at the Biblioteca Marciana (Gr. I. 19) in Venice.

See also 

 List of New Testament minuscules
 Biblical manuscript
 Textual criticism

References

Further reading 

 

Greek New Testament minuscules
14th-century biblical manuscripts
1301 works